Gavin Hume (born 25 March 1980 in Riversdale, Western Cape, South Africa) is a rugby union centre for Perpignan in the French Top 14. He joined Perpignan in 2004 from the Super 12 team Stormers.

External links
 ERC Rugby profile
 
 Its Rugby profile

Living people
1980 births
USA Perpignan players
Sharks (Currie Cup) players
Stormers players
Rugby union centres
Rugby union players from the Western Cape